Valbelle is a commune in the Alpes-de-Haute-Provence department in southeastern France. The word may also refer to:

 Dominique Valbelle (born 1947), french egyptologist
 Jean-Baptiste de Valbelle (1627–1681), French naval officer
 Joseph-Alphonse-Omer de Valbelle (1729-1818), French aristocrat and military officer
 Joseph-Anne de Valbelle de Tourves (1648–1722), French aristocrat, landowner and public official
 Louis-Alphonse de Valbelle (1640–1708), French Roman Catholic Bishop